Abdul Majeed Maruwala (born 1 February 1963) is a Pakistani former wrestler who competed in the 1984 Summer Olympics and in the 1988 Summer Olympics.

References

External links
 

1963 births
Living people
Olympic wrestlers of Pakistan
Wrestlers at the 1984 Summer Olympics
Wrestlers at the 1988 Summer Olympics
Pakistani male sport wrestlers
Asian Games medalists in wrestling
Wrestlers at the 1986 Asian Games
Asian Games gold medalists for Pakistan
Medalists at the 1986 Asian Games
20th-century Pakistani people